Rico Suave may refer to:

Rico Suave (wrestler), Puerto Rican professional wrestler
Rico Suave (character), Hannah Montana series character
"Rico Suave" (song), a 1990 single issued by the rapper Gerardo